Sun Zhu (1711–1778) was a Qing scholar. He was also known as Hengtang Tuishi ("Retired Master of Hengtang") and was the original compiler and editor of the anthology Three Hundred Tang Poems, a popular compilation of Tang poetry, partly designed as a study aid for students. An enduring classic, Sun Zhu's version has often been reprinted, often in revised or re-edited editions.

Biography
Dissatisfied with the anthology Poems by a Thousand Masters (Qianjiashi ) compiled by Liu Kezhuang in the late Southern Song dynasty and influenced by Ming Dynasty poetry anthologies, Sun selected the poems for a new anthology, based upon their popularity and educational value. His collection has been popular ever since, and can be found in many Chinese households. For centuries, elementary students memorized the poems and used them to learn to read and write. The collection includes selections of most major forms of Tang poetry of the shi form, which is considered to be the main poetic type. Major poets whose works appear in Sun Zhu's anthology include Du Fu, Li Bai, Wang Wei, Li Shangyin, Meng Haoran, and Bai Juyi.

See also

List of Three Hundred Tang Poems poets
Quantangshi
Classical Chinese poetry

Notes

References
Wu, John C. H. (1972). The Four Seasons of Tang Poetry. Rutland, Vermont: Charles E. Tuttle. 
Yu, Pauline (2002). "Chinese Poetry and Its Institutions", in Hsiang Lectures on Chinese Poetry, Volume 2, Grace S. Fong, editor. Montreal: Center for East Asian Research, McGill University.

External links
www.zhongwen.com

Book editors
Qing dynasty poets
1711 births
1778 deaths
Writers from Wuxi
Chinese poetry anthologists
Poets from Jiangsu
18th-century Chinese writers